Jerzy Dąbrowski, Dąmbrowski, Dombrowski Junosza coat of arms, nom de guerre "Łupaszka" (born 29 April 1889 in Suwałki, executed under Soviet jurisdiction on the night of the 16th to 17 December 1940, after extensive torture at a prison in Mińsk) – cavalry officer with the rank of podpułkownik (Lieutenant Colonel) in the Polish Army of the Second Polish Republic, guerilla fighter.

Of notable men who served under Lt. Col. Jerzy Dąmbrowski were Capt. Witold Pilecki (at the time of the Polish-Soviet war, 1918–1921) and Maj. Henryk Dobrzański "Hubal" (during the Polish Defensive war, 1939).

Decorations
Silver Cross of the Order Virtuti Militari (1922)
Cross of Valour, four times
Golden Cross of Merit

See also
 Polish contribution to World War II
 Polish Secret State
 List of guerrillas: Poland

References

1889 births
1940 deaths
People from Suwałki
People from Suwałki Governorate
Polish nobility
Clan of Junosza
Polish Army officers
Russian military personnel of World War I
Polish I Corps in Russia personnel
Polish people of the Polish–Soviet War
Republic of Central Lithuania
Polish military personnel of World War II
Polish resistance members of World War II
Guerrillas
Recipients of the Silver Cross of the Virtuti Militari
Recipients of the Cross of Merit (Poland)
Recipients of the Cross of Valour (Poland)
Polish people executed by the Soviet Union